Hoshangabad district, officially Narmadapuram district, is one of the districts of Madhya Pradesh state of India, and Hoshangabad city is the district headquarters.

Geography
The district has an area of 5408.23 km². Hoshangabad district is bounded by the districts of Raisen to the north, Narsinghpur to the east, Chhindwara to the southeast, Betul to the south, Harda to the west, and Sehore to the northwest. In 1998, the western portion of Hoshangabad District was split off to become Harda District.

The district lies in the Narmada River valley, and the Narmada forms the northern boundary of the district, Hoshangabad District is part of Narmadapuram Division. The Tawa River is the longest tributary of the Narmada, rising in the Satpura Range to the south and flowing north to meet the Narmada at the village of Bandra Bhan. The Tawa Reservoir lies in the south-central region of the district.

Hoshangabad district is also home to Pachmarhi, a hill station and popular tourist spot in the Satpura Range in the southern part of the district. Pachmarhi was the summer capital of the British Raj Central Provinces and Berar.

The Pachmarhi Sanctuary (461.37 km²) is part of the larger Pachmarhi Biosphere Preserve, which extends into Betul and Chhindwara districts.

The Rajat Prapat is located at Pachmarhi in Hoshangabad district. Bee Falls, Duchess Falls and Dupgrah, the highest peak of the Satpuras, are situated in Pachmarhi.

History
Hoshangabad district was part of the Nerbudda (Narmada) Division of the Central Provinces and Berar, which became the state of Madhya Bharat (later Madhya Pradesh) after India's independence in 1947. Hoshangabad is also called Narmadapuram since it was previously named after the Narmada river, before being renamed after Sultan Hoshang Shah of Malwa.

Demographics

According to the 2011 census,  Hoshangabad District has a population of 1,241,350, roughly equal to the nation of Trinidad and Tobago or the US state of New Hampshire. This gives it a ranking of 387th in India (out of a total of 640). Its population growth rate over the decade 2001-2011 was 14.45%. Hoshangabad has a sex ratio of 912 females for every 1000 males, and a literacy rate of 76.52%. 31.42% of the population lives in urban areas. Scheduled Castes and Scheduled Tribes make up 16.51% and 15.89% of the population respectively.

Languages

At the time of the 2011 Census of India, 96.03% of the population in the district spoke Hindi, 0.97% Gondi and 0.96% Korku as their first language.

Economy
Hoshangabad is one of the fastest developing districts of Madhya Pradesh.

Agriculture
Agriculture growth is very high of the region. The land is quite fertile and farmers have good canal irrigation facilities from the Tawa Dam throughout the year. The farmers employ rotation of crops and their major income depends on Wheat, Soya Bean, Mung Bean, Sugarcane, Gram, Paddy cultivation etc. Hoshangabad is the largest wheat producer and one of the largest soya bean producer district in India.

Industries
There are lot of large and small scale industries(Oil mill, Sugar mill, Wooden, Engineering etc.). Itarsi is the largest economic center and logistic hub in the district. Security Paper Mill, Hoshangabad and Ordnance Factory, Itarsi are most valuable industrial units of Government of India.

Tourism
Pachmarhi is known for its natural environment, and lies at an altitude of 3,555 feet. It is surrounded by the Satpura hills. Satpura National Park and Madai Tiger Reserve are wildlife.

Transportation

Road
 National Highway NH69
 State Highways SH15, SH19, SH19A, SH22

Rail
Itarsi Junction is one of the largest and busiest Railway Stations in India. Approximately 250 trains for all over India pass through this station. Other Railway Stations are Hoshangabad, Pipariya, Banapura Sohagpur Bankhedi.

Air
The nearest airport is Raja Bhoj Airport Bhopal.

Education 
Out of 11 colleges, seven are Post Graduate Colleges. Post Graduate courses in Science/Arts/Commerce are available at the following Colleges:

 Home Science College, Hoshangabad
 Kusum Mahavidyalaya, Seonimalwa
 Makhanlal Chaturvedi National University of Journalism and Communication 
 Narmada Maha Vidyalaya, Hoshangabad
 Mahatma Gandhi Smiriti Maha Vidyalaya, Itarsi
 Shaskiya Kanya Mahavidyalaya, Pipariya
 Shaskiya Snatkottar Mahavidyalaya, Pipariya
 Swami Dayanand Adarsh Mahavidyalaya, Seoni Malwa

Total Literacy of the District : 54.11%

Male Literacy of the District : 67.19%

Female Literacy of the District : 39.29%

Media
Newspapers: Hoshangabad has a few print publications newspapers such as, Dainik Bhaskar.

Television: Doordarshan Broadcasting Center in Itarsi  Pipariya and Pachmarhi.

References

External links

 
Districts of Madhya Pradesh